Guram Tetrashvili (born 2 August 1988) is a Russian professional football player of Georgian ethnic origin. He plays in Kazakhstan for Okzhetpes. He primarily plays as defensive midfielder or right back.

Club career
He left FC Anzhi Makhachkala by mutual consent on 25 November 2018.

On 9 March 2019, Tetrashvili signed for FC Gomel.

On 4 July 2019, he returned to the Russian Premier League, joining Tambov.

Career statistics

Club

Notes

References

External links
 
 

1988 births
Sportspeople from Vladikavkaz
Living people
Russian footballers
Russian expatriate footballers
Russian sportspeople of Georgian descent
Association football defenders
FC Spartak Vladikavkaz players
FC Mashuk-KMV Pyatigorsk players
FC Luch Vladivostok players
FC Tosno players
FC Anzhi Makhachkala players
FC Gomel players
FC Tambov players
FC Okzhetpes players
Russian Premier League players
Russian First League players
Belarusian Premier League players
Kazakhstan First Division players
Russian expatriate sportspeople in Belarus
Russian expatriate sportspeople in Kazakhstan
Expatriate footballers in Belarus
Expatriate footballers in Kazakhstan